"Little Queen" is a song written and recorded by the rock band Heart.  It was released as the second single from the band's second album Little Queen in 1977. The song is a midtempo rock and roll number similar in style to Heart's past hit "Magic Man" but much gentler than the album's hard rock debut single, "Barracuda". Although the song has endured as a fan-favorite amongst Heart's audience, "Little Queen" did not perform as well as previous singles when released, peaking at number sixty-two on the U.S. Billboard Hot 100.

In concert, Heart performed "Little Queen" during the 1977-1980 tours before dropping for future tours. The band began performing it again off and on during their 2007 tour and has continued rotating it periodically during subsequent years.

Reception
Cash Box said that it "makes smooth transitions from a funky beat to an expansive bridge of dreamy vocal choruses."  Record World said that it "should continue [Heart's] success" from their previous single "Barracuda."

Chart performance

References

Heart (band) songs
1977 singles
Songs written by Nancy Wilson (rock musician)
Songs written by Ann Wilson
1977 songs
Portrait Records singles
Song recordings produced by Mike Flicker